The English Historical Review is a bimonthly peer-reviewed academic journal that was established in 1886 and published by Oxford University Press (formerly Longman). It publishes articles on all aspects of history – British, European, and world history – since the classical era. It is the oldest surviving English language academic journal in the discipline of history.

Six issues are published each year, and typically include four articles from a broad chronological range (roughly, medieval, early modern, modern and twentieth century) and around sixty book reviews. Review Articles are commissioned by the editors. A summary of international periodical literature published in the previous twelve months is also provided, and an annual summary of editions, reference works and other materials of interest to scholars is also produced.

The journal was established in 1886 by John Dalberg-Acton, 1st Baron Acton, Regius professor of modern history at Cambridge, and a fellow of All Souls College, Oxford. The first editor was Mandell Creighton. The current editors are Nandini Chatterjee, Stephen Conway, Peter Marshall, Jan Rüger, Hannah Skoda, and Alice Taylor.

List of editors
Editors of The English Historical Review:
 1886–1891: Mandell Creighton
 1891–1894: Samuel Rawson Gardiner, assisted by Reginald Lane Poole
 1895–1901: S. R. Gardiner and Reginald Lane Poole
 1902–1920: Reginald Lane Poole, assisted (1920) by George Norman Clark
 1921–1925: G. N. Clark assisted (1924-5) by E. Stanley Cohn
 1926: G. N. Clark and Charles William Previté-Orton
 1927–1938: C. W. Previté-Orton
 1938–1939: C. W. Previté-Orton and G. N. Clark
 1939–1958: John Goronwy Edwards and Richard Pares
 1958–1959: J. G. Edwards and Denys Hay
 1959–1965: Denys Hay
 1965–1967: John Michael Wallace-Hadrill
 1967–1974: J. M. Wallace-Hadrill and John Morris Roberts
 1974–1978: J. M. Roberts and George Arthur Holmes
 1978–1981: G. A. Holmes and Angus Donald Macintyre
 1982–1986: A. D. Macintyre and Penry Herbert Williams
 1986–1990: P. H. Williams and Robert John Weston Evans
 1991–1995: R. J. W.  Evans and John Maddicott
 1996–1999: J. H. Maddicott and John Stevenson
 1999–2001: J. H. Maddicott and Jean Dunbabin
 2001: Jean Dunbabin and John Rowlatt
 2001–2004: Jean Dunbabin and George W. Bernard
 2004–2006: G. W. Bernard and Philip Waller
 2007–2012: G. W Bernard and Martin Conway
 2012–2013: Martin Conway and Catherine Holmes
 2013–2016: Martin Conway, Catherine Holmes, and Peter Marshall
 2017–?: Catherine Holmes, Peter Marshall, Stephen Conway, and Hannah Skoda

See also
 Historiography
 Historiography of the United Kingdom

References

Further reading

External links 

 
 

1886 establishments in England
English-language journals
History journals
Bimonthly journals
Oxford University Press academic journals
Publications established in 1886